Marshall D. Gates Jr. (1915–2003) was an American chemist, holding the position of C.F. Houghton Professor of Chemistry at the University of Rochester. He was an organic chemist whose research was in the field of natural product synthesis. He is best known for publishing the first total synthesis of morphine in 1952.

Biography
Marshall Gates was born in 1915 in Boyne City, Michigan. He received his undergraduate training at Rice University and his masters and doctoral degrees from Harvard University. He married Martha L. Meyer with whom he had two sons and two daughters. From 1941 to 1949 he taught at Bryn Mawr College at which point he moved to the University of Rochester where he remained until his retirement in 1981. From 1943 to 1946 he did work for the National Defense Council and served as editor in chief of the Journal of the American Chemical Society from 1949 to 1969. In honor of his death in 2003, a named professorship was established at the University of Rochester Department of Chemistry.

Morphine Total Synthesis

Gates's total synthesis of morphine was the first of its kind and an important confirmation of the structural determination made by Robert Robinson some 27 years prior. The synthesis was based on the construction of a cyanodiketone from the dihydroxynaphthalene shown below. The key step was a high-pressure Diels-Alder reaction with butadiene that established the fused ring system core. Reductive coupling between the hydroxyl and cyano groups furnished the ethylamine bridge and further elaboration (including an arduous epimerization of the highlighted stereocenter) established the so-called "Gates Intermediate." Syntheses published thereafter focused, for a time, on improvements to the synthesis of this intermediate as well as the final steps.

References
 
 Nicolaou, K.C. and Montagon T. Molecules that Changed the World. Germany: Wiley-VCH, 2008.
 Gates, M.D.; Tschudi, G. J. Am. Chem. Soc., 1956, 78 (7), pp 1380–1393. 
 "Morphine and Codeine," Baran Lab Presentation. Link

Further reading

1915 births
2003 deaths
20th-century American chemists
Rice University alumni
Harvard University alumni
Bryn Mawr College faculty
University of Rochester faculty
People from Boyne City, Michigan